Mastax laeviceps is a species of beetle in the family Carabidae found in India and Myanmar.

References

Mastax laeviceps
Beetles of Asia
Beetles described in 1891